San Bernardo is the name of 2 villages in Yucatán, Mexico.

One, also called Bernardo, is located at 
One is located at

References

Populated places in Yucatán